Igor Kollár (born 25 June 1965 in Žiar nad Hronom, Banská Bystrica Region) is a retired male race walker from Slovakia. He is a three-time Olympian.

Achievements

References
 
 

1965 births
Living people
Slovak male racewalkers
Athletes (track and field) at the 1992 Summer Olympics
Athletes (track and field) at the 1996 Summer Olympics
Athletes (track and field) at the 2000 Summer Olympics
Olympic athletes of Slovakia
Olympic athletes of Czechoslovakia
People from Kremnica
Sportspeople from the Banská Bystrica Region